Family Ties is a collaborative studio album by American rapper Fat Joe and record producer Dre of the record production duo Cool & Dre. It was released on December 6, 2019, via RNG (Rap's New Generation) and EMPIRE.

The album features guest appearances from Jeremih, Anuel AA, Big Bank DTE, Bryson Tiller, Cardi B, Eminem, Lil Wayne, Mary J. Blige, Remy Ma and Ty Dolla $ign. The album debuted at number 81 on the US Billboard 200 albums chart.

Track listing
Adapted from Apple Music

Charts

References

2019 albums
Fat Joe albums
Empire Distribution albums
Albums produced by Hitmaka
Albums produced by Cool & Dre
Collaborative albums